Galeazzo Moroni or Galeazzo Morone (died 1613) was a Roman Catholic prelate who served as Bishop of Macerata e Tolentino (1586–1613), Bishop of Recanati (1573–1592),
Bishop of Macerata (1573–1586).

Biography
On 10 Jun 1573, Galeazzo Moroni was appointed during the papacy of Pope Gregory XIII as Bishop of Macerata and Bishop of Recanati.
In 1573, he was consecrated bishop by Charles Borromeo, Archbishop of Milan. 
On 10 Dec 1586, his title was changed to Bishop of Macerata e Tolentino after the diocese was merged with the Diocese of Tolentino.
He resigned as Bishop of Recanati on 9 Feb 1592. 
He served as Bishop of Macerata e Tolentino until his death on 1 Sep 1613.

While bishop, he was the principal co-consecrator of Giovanni Antonio Onorati, Bishop of Terni (1591); and Settimio Borsari, Bishop of Alessano (1591).

References

External links and additional sources
 (for Chronology of Bishops) 
 (for Chronology of Bishops) 
 (for Chronology of Bishops) 
 (for Chronology of Bishops) 

16th-century Italian Roman Catholic bishops
17th-century Italian Roman Catholic bishops
Bishops appointed by Pope Gregory XIII
1613 deaths